Ukraina class is a class of Russian river passenger ships. It is named after the first ship in the class Ukraina, which in her turn was named after Ukraine.

Three-deck cruise ships manufactured by Österreichische Schiffswerften AG at their shipyard in Korneuburg, Austria in 1979.

River cruise ships of the Austrian project Q-003

Overview

See also
 List of river cruise ships
 Valerian Kuybyshev-class motorship
 Rossiya-class motorship (1952)
 Rossiya-class motorship (1973)
 Anton Chekhov-class motorship
 Vladimir Ilyich-class motorship
 Rodina-class motorship
 Baykal-class motorship
 Sergey Yesenin-class motorship
 Oktyabrskaya Revolyutsiya-class motorship
 Yerofey Khabarov-class motorship
 Dunay-class motorship
 Volga-class motorship
 Amur-class motorship
 Dmitriy Furmanov-class motorship

References

River cruise ships
Ships of Russia
Ships of the Soviet Union
Austria–Soviet Union relations
1979 ships